Utterson may refer to:
Gabriel John Utterson, a central character in The Strange Case of Dr Jekyll and Mr Hyde (1886)
Edward Vernon Utterson (1775/1776–1856), English lawyer, literary antiquary, collector and editor
Jimmy Utterson (1914–1935), English footballer
Kevin Utterson (born 1976), Scottish rugby player
Sarah Elizabeth Utterson (1781–1851), English translator and author
Shaun Utterson (born 1990), English footballer
Utterson, Ontario, a community in Huntsville, Ontario

See also 
 John Utterson-Kelso (1893–1972), British Army officer